The 2014 Seguros Bolívar Open Cali was a professional tennis tournament played on clay courts. It was the seventh edition of the tournament which was part of the 2014 ATP Challenger Tour. It took place in Cali, Colombia between 28 April and 4 May 2014.

Singles main-draw entrants

Seeds

Other entrants
The following players received wildcards into the singles main draw:
  Michael Quintero
  Giovanni Lapentti
  Eduardo Struvay
  Juan Carlos Spir

The following players received entry from the qualifying draw:
  Gonzalo Escobar
  Sergio Galdós
  Ryusei Makiguchi
  Mathias Bourgue

Champions

Singles

 Gonzalo Lama def.   Marco Trungelliti, 6–3, 4–6, 6–3

Doubles

  Facundo Bagnis /  Eduardo Schwank def.  Nicolás Barrientos /  Eduardo Struvay, 6–3, 6–3

External links
Official Website

Seguros Bolivar Open Cali
Seguros Bolívar Open Cali
2014 in Colombian tennis